The Horch P240 or Sachsenring P240 was a luxury car built by the VEB Kraftfahrzeugwerk Horch Zwickau in East Germany between 1955 and 1959.  The early preproduction models can be identified by the grill, which is divided in two and has vertical bars.

Despite a provision issued by the Comecon limiting production of luxurious cars in Czechoslovakia to no more than 300 per year, Tatra was manufacturing more units than the limit. This became an issue in 1957 and 1958, especially considering East Germany was producing the Sachsenring P240 as its own luxurious car. The Comecon decided that the two countries must reach a deal to decide which country would continue production to supply the other with luxurious passenger vehicles. In 1958 the Ministries of Interior of both countries took part in trials, which the East German Minister of Machinery personally attended. The Tatra 603 won, and subsequently East Germany's higher communist officials began to drive the T603, while lower officials had to drive imports from the USSR (especially Volga).

References

External links
  UK-based official Wartburg, Trabant and IFA owners' club
 Photograph of a P240 sedan in the August Horch Museum in Zwickau

Sachsenring vehicles